Georgi Vladimirov Stoilov (3 April 1929 – 14 December 2022) was a Bulgarian architect and politician.

Stoilov died in Sofia on 14 December 2022, at the age of 93.

References

1929 births
2022 deaths
Bulgarian architects
Bulgarian Communist Party politicians
Bulgarian Socialist Party politicians
Government ministers of Bulgaria
Mayors of Sofia
Recipients of the Order of Georgi Dimitrov
People from Pernik Province